Gerald Elmer Hampton is a retired American football and wrestling coach.  He served as the head football coach at Graceland University in Lamoni, Iowa in 1963 and again from 1965 to 1968. He also served as the head wrestling coach at Graceland.

Head coaching record

References

1932 births
Living people
Graceland Yellowjackets football coaches
College wrestling coaches in the United States
Sportspeople from Las Vegas